Haematomma staigeriae is a species of corticolous (bark-dwelling) lichen in the family Haematommataceae. Found in Costa Rica, it was formally described as a new species in 2006 by Matthew Nelsen, Robert Lücking, and Loengrin Umaña. Here, in a montane rainforest area with secondary vegetation dominated by Cecropia, the species was found growing on the lower trunks of trees. It is only known from the type locality. The specific epithet honours German lichenologist Bettina Staiger "for her contribution to the taxonomy and understanding of this genus".

Soralia are rounded with a mealy surface, measuring up to 2 mm in diameter. Ascospores number four to eight per ascus, and are narrowly  (spindle-shaped) with between 11 and 23  transverse septa and 0 or 1 longitudinal septa, and have dimensions of 50–90 by 6–10 μm. Lichen products found in Haematomma staigeriae include russulone and lichexanthone.

References

staigeriae
Lichen species
Lichens described in 2006
Lichens of Central America
Taxa named by Robert Lücking